KROQ Weenie Roast is a multi-artist music concert, presented annually in May by the Los Angeles, California, modern rock radio station KROQ-FM. Since its beginning in 1993, it has been traditionally held on a Saturday in May or June, but due to the COVID-19 pandemic, there have been no editions of the festival since 2019.

Overview
Every year, the KROQ Weenie Roast had taken place at Irvine Meadows/Verizon Wireless Amphitheatre, in Irvine, California with exception in 2000 when it was held at the Angel Stadium, then-known as the Edison International Field, in Anaheim, California. In 2016 Irvine Meadows Amphitheatre was demolished, and KROQ responded by announcing that the 2017 edition would take place at StubHub Center in Carson.

From 2006 to 2009, the event was re-branded as Weenie Roast y Fiesta with the distribution of complimentary sombreros for its festival attendees. In 2012 in conjunction with Cinco de Mayo it returned to the Weenie Roast y Fiesta name again.

Its East Coast "sister" concert, presented by KROQ-FM's Baltimore/Washington, DC affiliate station WHFS, is the HFStival. Its northern California "sister" concert, presented by KROQ-FM's Bay Area affiliate station KITS, is the BFD festival.

With the Irvine Meadows Amphitheatre's land lease due to expire in 2017, KROQ-FM announced that the 2016 event would be the last to be held at the venue. The Red Hot Chili Peppers were forced to cancel their headlining slot at the 2016 Weenie Roast, as singer Anthony Kiedis was rushed to the hospital prior to the band appearing on stage, due to severe stomach pain. His bandmates made the official announcement on the stage as they were due to appear. Weezer replaced them as the headlining act.

Due to the COVID-19 pandemic, there were no editions of the festival between 2020 and 2022.

Lineups
Bands listed in reverse order of night's performance (or alphabetical order if not known).

See also
KROQ Top 106.7 Countdowns

References

External links
 KROQ 106.7 – Weenie Roast

Music festivals in Los Angeles
Music festivals established in 1993
Weenie